The 2010 Hong Kong Super Series was a top level badminton competition which was held from December 7, 2010 to December 12, 2010 in Hong Kong. It was the 12th BWF Super Series competition on the 2010 BWF Super Series schedule. The total purse for the event was $200,000.

Men's singles

  Lee Chong Wei
  Peter Gade
  Taufik Hidayat
  Lin Dan
  Chen Jin
  Boonsak Ponsana
  Chen Long
  Nguyen Tien Minh

Top half

Bottom half

Final

Women's singles

  Wang Xin
  Saina Nehwal
  Wang Shixian
  Jiang Yanjiao
  Pi Hongyan
  Juliane Schenk
  Bae Youn-joo
  Ella Diehl

Top half

Bottom half

Final

Men's doubles

  Koo Kien Keat / Tan Boon Heong
  Markis Kido / Hendra Setiawan
  Jung Jae-sung / Lee Yong-dae
  Fang Chieh-min / Lee Sheng-mu
  Cai Yun / Fu Haifeng
  Ko Sung-hyun / Yoo Yeon-seong
  Alvent Yulianto / Hendra Aprida Gunawan
  Chen Hung-ling / Lin Yu-Lang

Top half

Bottom half

Final

Women's doubles

  Cheng Wen-hsing / Chien Yu-chin
  Cheng Shu / Zhao Yunlei
  Valeria Sorokina / Nina Vislova
  Meiliana Jauhari / Greysia Polii
  Pan Pan / Tian Qing
  Duanganong Aroonkesorn / Kunchala Voravichitchaikul
  Zhang Dan / Zhang Zhibo
  Ha Jung-eun / Jung Kyung-eun

Top half

Bottom half

Final

Mixed doubles

  Robert Mateusiak / Nadieżda Kostiuczyk
  Hendra Aprida Gunawan / Vita Marissa
  Sudket Prapakamol / Saralee Thungthongkam
  Nathan Robertson / Jenny Wallwork
  Zhang Nan / Zhao Yunlei
  Joachim Fischer Nielsen / Christinna Pedersen
  Songphon Anugritayawon / Kunchala Voravichitchaikul
  Lee Sheng-mu / Chien Yu-chin

Top half

Bottom half

Final

References

External links
Hong Kong Super Series 2010 at tournamentsoftware.com

2010
Open Super Series
Hong Kong